Two ships of the Royal Navy have borne the name HMS Plym, after the River Plym:

  was a gunvessel, previously a hired packet brig. She was fitted out in 1795 and sold in 1802.
  was a  launched in 1943. She was expended in Operation Hurricane, the atomic bomb test in 1952.

Royal Navy ship names